Delta Draconis (δ Draconis, abbreviated Delta Dra, δ Dra), formally named Altais , is a yellow star in the constellation of Draco. It has an apparent visual magnitude of 3.0, making it easily visible to the naked eye.

Nomenclature
δ Draconis (Latinised to Delta Draconis) is the star's Bayer designation.

It bore the traditional names Aldib, Altais (the goat) and Nodus Secundus. The title Altais was derived from Arabic Al Tāis "the Goat", the association of this star, along with Pi Draconis, Rho Draconis and Epsilon Draconis (Tyl). According to a 1971 NASA catalog of stars, Al Tāis or Tais were the title for three stars : Delta Draconis as Altais, Pi Draconis as Tais I and Rho Draconis as Tais II (exclude Epsilon Draconis). In 2016, the International Astronomical Union organized a Working Group on Star Names (WGSN) to catalogue and standardize proper names for stars. The WGSN approved the name Altais for this star on 21 August 2016 and it is now so included in the List of IAU-approved Star Names.

Properties
Delta Draconis is a giant star with a stellar classification of G9 III. This indicates that, at an estimated age of 800 million years, it has exhausted the supply of hydrogen at its core and entered a later stage in its evolution. At a parallax of 32.54 mas, this corresponds to a physical radius equal to 11 times the solar radius. It is radiating 59 times the luminosity of the Sun from its outer atmosphere at an effective temperature of 4,820 K. At this temperature, it is giving off the yellow-hued glow of a G-type star. With a mass 2.32 times that of the Sun, this star will end its life as a white dwarf.

Pole star 
Delta Draconis is the northern pole star of Ceres, lying 1.5 degrees from the true pole.

References
 

Draco (constellation)
Draconis, Delta
G-type giants
Altais
094376
Draconis, 57
180711
Durchmusterung objects
7310